Katothrips is a genus of thrips in the family Phlaeothripidae. It was first described by Laurence Alfred Mound in 1971. The type species is Kladothrips tityrus.

Species of this genus are found throughout all mainland states and territories of Australia, and they form galls on Acacias.

Species
 Katothrips argenteus
 Katothrips biconus
 Katothrips brevitibia
 Katothrips brigalowi
 Katothrips brunneicorpus
 Katothrips capitatus
 Katothrips dampieri
 Katothrips diamantinus
 Katothrips echinatus
 Katothrips enochrus
 Katothrips flindersi
 Katothrips glandis
 Katothrips grasbyi
 Katothrips hamersleyi
 Katothrips hoarei
 Katothrips hyrum
 Katothrips mackeyanae
 Katothrips maslini
 Katothrips melasmus
 Katothrips mitchelli
 Katothrips neottus
 Katothrips nodus
 Katothrips orionis
 Katothrips papulus
 Katothrips pendulae
 Katothrips peratus
 Katothrips sifrus
 Katothrips spinosissimus
 Katothrips spinosus
 Katothrips stuarti
 Katothrips tagacis
 Katothrips tityrus
 Katothrips uniconus
 Katothrips unicus
 Katothrips yamma

References

Phlaeothripidae
Thrips genera